Mohamed Alam can refer to:

 Mohamed Shah Alam (born 1962), Bangladeshi Olympic sprinter (1988)
 Mohamed Mahbub Alam (born 1972), Bangladeshi Olympic sprinter (2000)